Verticordia cunninghamii, commonly known as tree featherflower or liandu, is a flowering plant in the myrtle family, Myrtaceae and is endemic to an area in the extreme north of Western Australia and the Northern Territory.  It is a spindly shrub or small tree with narrow leaves and cream to white, sweetly scented, feathery flowers.

Description 

Flowering time is mainly from July to October, although it may vary, depending on rainfall.

Taxonomy and naming
Verticordia cunninghamii was first formally described by Johannes Conrad Schauer in 1843 and the description was published in Monographia Myrtacearum Xerocarpicarum. The specific epithet (cunninghamii) honours Allan Cunningham, who gathered the type collection at Roe River in the Kimberley region on the 14 December 1820.

Verticordia cunninghamii is the type species for Verticordia sect. Tropica. This section includes two other outlying species of an otherwise West Australian genus, V. verticillata and V. decussata.

Distribution and habitat
This verticordia has a widespread distribution in the north of Western Australia, including the Kimberley and in northern regions of the Northern Territory, including in Kakadu National Park. The species is usually associated with areas of seasonal flooding and watercourses, or along creeks, and has a preference for loam or gravel at exposed sandstone, growing in the white, or grey, or red sands there.

Conservation
Verticordia cunninghamii is classified as  "not threatened" by the Western Australian Government Department of Parks and Wildlife,

Use in horticulture
Verticordia cunninghamii is a difficult plant to propagate and grow in cultivation and its requirements are not yet fully understood.

References

cunninghamii
Flora of the Northern Territory
Rosids of Western Australia
Eudicots of Western Australia
Plants described in 1843